Otocinclus huaorani is a species of armoured catfish in the family Loricariidae found in Colombia, Ecuador and Peru.

Otocinclus huaorani can reach a maximum length of 3.2 cm.

Distribution and habitat 
Otocinclus huaorani is found in the Amazon river basin in Colombia and Peru and the Orinoco river basin in Colombia. It is also found in Loreto, Peru and in the Napo river basin in Ecuador. The type locality for the species is a tributary of the San Miguel river in Napo, Ecuador It is found at altitudes of 100–400 m.

Otocinclus huaorani is found in rivers and streams that have lime and also oxbow lakes. It is a benthic fish.

Status 
Otocinclus huaorani is classified as least concern by the IUCN Red List due to its wide range. The species is threatened in some areas by water pollution from urban waste and agricultural runoff.

References 

Hypoptopomatini
Taxa named by Scott Allen Schaefer
Fish described in 1997